Scholten is a Dutch surname

Scholten may also refer to:

Scholten, Missouri, an unincorporated community in Barry County, Missouri, U.S.
Scholten, German name for the commune Cenade in Romania
, Holland-America Line ocean liner (named after Willem Albert Scholten) that perished in the Channel in 1887

See also

Schouten (disambiguation)